Repeater Books is a publishing imprint based in London, founded in 2014 by Tariq Goddard and Mark Fisher, formerly the founders of radical publishers Zero Books, along with Etan Ilfeld, Tamar Shlaim, Alex Niven and Matteo Mandarini.

Formation 
In 2014, after disagreements with their parent company John Hunt Publishing, Zero Books founders Tariq Goddard and Mark Fisher, as well as Matteo Mandarini, editor Alex Niven and publicist Tamar Shlaim, resigned, and formed the new imprint Repeater Books.

In 2015, Repeater Books published its first two titles: The Isle of Minimus, an experimental novel by M. K. L. Murphy; and Lean Out, a feminist polemic by the journalist Dawn Foster. They have since published books by Mark Fisher, David Stubbs, Graham Harman, Mat Osman, Steven Shaviro, Leila Taylor, Claire Cronin, and Eugene Thacker, amongst others.

Watkins Media 
Repeater Books is an imprint within Watkins Media, a publishing organisation owned by entrepreneur Etan Ilfeld, whose imprints also include Angry Robot and Nourish, as well as London's famous esoteric bookshop Watkins Books.

Authors 

Tristam Adams
Monster Bobby
Grace Blakeley
Gavin Butt
Claire Cronin (singer-songwriter)
Cynthia Cruz
 Kodwo Eshun
 Mark Fisher
 Dawn Foster
 Eliane Glaser
 Tariq Goddard
 Graham Harman
Owen Hatherley
James Heartfield 
Aaron J. Leonard
 Tom Lutz
Anna Minton
Alex Niven
Mat Osman
Simon Reynolds
Lee Scott (rapper)
 Steven Shaviro
 Christiana Spens
 Terence Stamp
 David Stubbs
Eugene Thacker
Patrick Wright (historian)

References 

Book publishing companies based in London